= Atholhurst =

- Location within Gauteng Location within South Africa
- Coordinates: 26°07′08″S 28°04′14″E
- Country: South Africa
- Province: Gauteng
- Municipality: City of Johannesburg

Area
  - Total: 0.44 km^{2} (0.17 sq mi)

Population (2001)
  - Total: 277
  - Density: 630/km^{2} (1,600/sq mi)
- Time zone: UTC+2 (SAST)
- Postal code (street): 2196

Atholhurst is a suburb of Johannesburg, South Africa. It is located in Region E.
